Dominika Peczynski (born 20 September 1970) is a Polish-Swedish singer, model and television host.

Army of Lovers 
She joined the Swedish pop music group Army of Lovers in 1992, making her debut with the group with "Hasta Mañana", a cover of the ABBA song. Peczynski already knew the other members of Army of Lovers; Michaela Dornonville de la Cour and Camilla Henemark worked for the same modelling agency as her, she had been at school with Jean-Pierre Barda and had previously had a relationship with Alexander Bard.

Post Army of Lovers 
Since the Army of Lovers split, she has worked as a TV presenter for a number of different Swedish and overseas shows, including the Swedish version of Temptation Island and her own programme, Dominika's Planet, which aired in the UK. In 1998 she posed for the adult magazine Playboy.

Since 2002 she has been running a public relations company.

In 2005 a new music project called Nouveau Riche was launched, featuring Peczynski and Ulrich Bermsjö. Their debut single "Oh Lord" was released in November 2005. Following the release of their second single "Hardcore Life", Peczynski left the band. After several weeks, however, she was replaced by another female singer and her contributions to the band have been removed from all subsequent releases and official marketing tools.

She competed in the celebrity dance show Let's Dance 2017 which is broadcast on TV4.

In 2018 Peczynski founded Treatya.com, a booking platform for beauty treatments at home.

Personal life 
Peczynski grew up in a Jewish family. She has two children: daughter Hannah Sabina Edna Bahri (born 1 August 2000) with Claes Bahri, and son Harry Bartal (born 8 August 2011) with Yoav Bartal. Since 2015, Peczynski has been in a relationship with Sweden's former Minister of Finance Anders Borg. They married on 3 November 2018. On 22 June 2022, Peczynski announced that she and Borg had filed for divorce without "time for reflection", meaning immediately.

References

External links

1970 births
Living people
Musicians from Warsaw
Polish emigrants to Sweden
20th-century Polish Jews
Swedish dance musicians
21st-century Swedish singers
21st-century Swedish women singers
English-language singers from Sweden